Speed climbing is a climbing discipline in which speed is the ultimate goal. Speed climbing is done on rocks, walls and poles and is only recommended for highly skilled and experienced climbers. 

Competition speed climbing, which takes place on an artificial standardized climbing wall, is the main form of speed climbing. However, there are other variations of speed climbing that take place outdoors. In pure speed climbing, time is everything but it is also common to record speed ascents while observing a particular climbing style or ethic.  For example, there are many speed records in which the climb was done according to free climbing ethics.  In popular culture speed climbing may be best known for a viral video featuring Dan Osman climbing Lover's Leap via the Bear's Reach route (5.7, 120+ meter) in 4 min 25 sec.  This clip was originally featured in the movie Masters of Stone IV.

Competition speed climbing
Competition speed climbing as governed by the International Federation of Sport Climbing (IFSC) takes place on  artificial walls. Competitors climb a 5-degree overhanging IFSC-certified wall, with an auto-belaying system from the top of the wall.

Since 2007 the IFSC has created a standard wall for the world record. The standard has a simple rule and it involves climbers competing on the same route, side by side, and whoever reaches the top first wins. The holds and order are always identical, and the difficulty rating is around F6b (approximately YDS 5.10c), which is a level most recreational climbers could complete. The IFSC also sanctions speed climbing competitions and those events that entail world record attempts. Speed climbing was one of the three climbing modalities included in the combined format at the 2020 Olympic Games in Tokyo, along with lead and bouldering. Beginning at the 2024 Summer Olympics in Paris, speed climbing will be its own standalone competition, separate from the lead and bouldering combined event.

Time is determined by mechanical-electric timing (the competitor leaves the starting pad and strikes a switch at the top of the route). When mechanical-electric timing is used, the climbing time is displayed with an accuracy of one-hundredth of a second. In the rules modifications in 2018, the possibility to use manual timing was removed, and the mechanical-electric timing should record with a precision of 1/1000 second. This precision is only used for ranking in case of a tie. Further, the timing system needs to announce a false start, which is considered a start earlier than 0.1 seconds after the starting beep.

World champions
The defending men's and women's speed climbing world champions are Danyil Boldyrev of Ukraine and Natalia Kałucka of Poland, respectively; they won their respective speed events at the 2021 IFSC Climbing World Championships in Moscow, Russia. Veddriq Leonardo of Indonesia and Emma Hunt of the United States were the overall men's and women's winners for the 2021 IFSC Climbing World Cup speed series.

World and Olympic records

Since Qixin Zhong of China ran the 15-meter standardized wall in 6.26 seconds in 2011, the world record has been broken 12 times, seven times in 2021 and 2022, most recently 5.009 seconds by Kiromal Katibin of Indonesia in July 2022. That represents a drop of 20 percent since 2011. Similarly, the women's speed climbing record has been broken 14 times between 2013 and 2022, dropping from 7.85 seconds to the 6.53 seconds set by Aleksandra Mirosław of Poland in May 2022, a 16.8-percent reduction.

Outdoor speed climbing

Pure speed climbing
Full speed climbing is done in such a way that maximizes speed and minimizes danger.  When climbing with a partner the climbers will alternate between regular free climbing, simul climbing, aiding, and at times sections of roped soloing.  Speed climbing can also be done by an individual in which they alternate between forms of rope soloing, aiding, and free soloing.  Strictly speaking, this type of speed climbing is not a style but a combination or perhaps a type of aid climbing.  However, the complexity of combining all the styles together leads to what can be recognized as a separate style with its own particular techniques used in no other style.

Speed climbing offers a number of benefits and these include the opportunities to stress-proof learned climbing techniques and to learn more about pacing. Pacing is important since a broad array of paces contributes to the climber's versatility to navigate crags and rock types. A faster pace for most climbers is said to be less strenuous than climbing at their normal speed.

Style climbing
Records can be recorded while climbing in a particular style.  Each of the methods ultimately handicap the rate of progress with the exception of free soloing.

Free soloing
The simplest way to increase the speed of climbing is to shed all safety precautions such as belaying and placing protection. For some climbers, this is the same as replacing the strength of the rope and the safety gears with mental toughness.  This leads to free soloing as rapidly as possible.  While strictly speaking this qualifies as full speed climbing or a type of style climbing it is different enough to be recognized as its own category of speed climbing.

Outdoor records 
Most speed climbing records lack the standards normally associated with objective records.  Hans Florine has written "I will be the first to say that climbing is silly. To make rules about it is just piling ridiculous on top of silly."
There are no sanctioned speed climbing competitions on significant rock features.  Nearly all climbing goals and records are self-designed, self-timed, and self-officiated; few are well documented, and many are disputed.

The collection that follows abides by these loose standards.

The time format below is either hrs:min or hrs:min:sec.

California
The Nose, El Capitan
1:58:07 Alex Honnold and Tommy Caldwell June 2018.
2:10:15 Alex Honnold and Tommy Caldwell May 2018.
2:19:44 Brad Gobright and Jim Reynolds October 2017.
4:43 Mayan Smith-Gobat and Libby Sauter October 2014 (all female ascent).
12:15 Heidi Wertz and Wera Shulte-Pelcum 2004 (all female ascent).
11:41 Hans Florine solo. July 2005.
11:00 Tommy Caldwell  2005 (free ascent male).
23:46 Lynn Hill 1994 (free ascent).

Regular Northwest Route, Half Dome
1:53:25 Jim Herson and Hans Florine 1999.
5:25 Heidi Wertz and Wera Shulte-Pelcum 2004 (all female ascent).
3:58 Hans Florine solo 1999 (Full day also included El Cap).
Snake Dike, Half Dome
3:00 Dean Potter 1998 (car to car).

Joshua Tree National Park
280 Routes in a day Michael Reardon solo 2004.
 10 climbs 100 feet tall 45 minutes free solo, Dennis George
 600 feet car to summit with a steep approach of half mile Idyllwild, CA 
 10,000 feet in 24 hours Joshua Tree, CA climb for breast cancer

Colorado
Bastille Crack
 00:05:33 Mic Fairchild solo 1998.

Third Flatiron
 36:27 Bill Briggs solo 1989 (car to car).

Nevada
Epinephrine
0:39:40 Alex Honnold 2018
1:15 Jash Stwart solo 2002.

Cat In The Hat
2:35 David Laxton solo 2013.

New York
The Gunks
50 Routes 13:30 Peter Darmi solo 2004.
46 Routes 13:30 Eric Weigeshoff and Peter Darmi 2004.  3400' of climbing and descent.
51 Routes 13:30 Eric Weigeshoff and Peter Darmi 2006  3400' of climbing and descent.

Wyoming
Grand Traverse
6:40 Rolando Garibotti solo 2000.

See also 
 Climbing styles
 Rock climbing
 Climbing competition
 International Federation of Sport Climbing (IFSC)
 USA Climbing

References 

Types of climbing